Stan Cooper (born September 21, 1940) is a former Wyoming State Senator, representing District 14 from 2005 until 2017.

Early life and education
Cooper was born in McKeesport, Pennsylvania. Cooper graduated from Utah State University in 1967 with a bachelor's degree in business administration. From 1975 to 1994 he was the owner of Sublette Electric.

Political history
Cooper first entered politics when he was elected to the Kemmerer City Council, starting his time in that body in 1982. He served there until 1988. From 1995 to 2002 Cooper was a county commissioner in Lincoln County, Wyoming. From 2003 to 2005 he served as a member of the Wyoming State House, and from the beginning of 2005 to 2017 he was in the Wyoming State Senate.

Family
Cooper is a Latter-day Saint. He and his wife Julie are the parents of five children.

Sources 
 Vote Smart entry on Cooper

References

1940 births
Living people
Republican Party Wyoming state senators
Republican Party members of the Wyoming House of Representatives
People from Kemmerer, Wyoming
People from McKeesport, Pennsylvania
Utah State University alumni
Latter Day Saints from Pennsylvania
21st-century American politicians
Latter Day Saints from Wyoming